Vicente Escobar (1757 - 1834) was a Cuban painter.  A native of Havana, he was initially self-trained as an artist, though he later graduated from the Real Academia de Bellas Artes de San Fernando in Madrid.  He then undertook a voyage through Spain, Italy, and France, before becoming painter to Queen Maria Cristina in 1827.  Escobar was the first painter to have a workshop in Cuba; among his pupils there was Juan del Río.  Escobar primarily painted portraits for the duration of his career.  He died in Havana in 1834.

References
Biography at Cernuda Arte
Veerle Poupeye. Caribbean Art.  London; Thames and Hudson; 1998.

1757 births
1854 deaths
Cuban painters
People from Havana